Berlin-Zehlendorf (in German Bahnhof Berlin-Zehlendorf) is a railway station in southwestern Zehlendorf (Berlin) within the city of Berlin, Germany. It is served by the Berlin S-Bahn line S1 and is one of the stops of the X10, 285, 112, N84, N10, 101, 115, and 623 busses.

References

External links
Station information 

Berlin S-Bahn stations
Railway stations in Berlin
Buildings and structures in Steglitz-Zehlendorf
Railway stations in Germany opened in 1838